Cecil Green (né Judge Cecil Holt; September 30, 1919 – July 29, 1951) was an American racecar driver from Dallas, Texas.

Racing career
Green won 34 midget races between 1948 and 1950 in Oklahoma and Missouri, and several more in Texas. He won the 1949 Oklahoma City and Southwest AAA titles. He won in seven different Offenhauser cars. Green placed fourth in his first Indianapolis 500 in 1950. He finished 22nd in the 1951 Indianapolis 500.

Green was killed while attempting to qualify for an AAA sprint car race at Funk's Speedway in Winchester, Indiana on July 29, 1951, a day which became known as "Black Sunday".

Green was a World War II veteran, having enlisted in the United States Army in Houston in April 1942. At that time he was a married man residing at an unincorporated section of Harris County – the same county where the Houston metropolitan area lies. In the United States Army Green reached the rank of corporal, becoming a Fifth Grade Technician in the Ordnance Department.

Career award
Green was inducted in the National Midget Auto Racing Hall of Fame in 2003.

Indy 500 results

World Championship career summary
The Indianapolis 500 was part of the FIA World Championship from 1950 through 1960. Drivers competing at Indy during those years were credited with World Championship points and participation. Cecil Green participated in 2 World Championship races. He started on the pole 0 times, won 0 races, set 0 fastest laps, and finished on the podium 0 times. He accumulated a total of 3 championship points.

References

1919 births
1951 deaths
Racing drivers from Dallas
Indianapolis 500 drivers
AAA Championship Car drivers
Racing drivers who died while racing
Sports deaths in Indiana